Gustavo Vassallo (20 July 1920 – 1 August 2012) was an Argentine fencer. He competed in the individual and team sabre events at the 1960 Summer Olympics.

References

1920 births
2012 deaths
Argentine male fencers
Argentine sabre fencers
Olympic fencers of Argentina
Fencers at the 1960 Summer Olympics
Fencers from Buenos Aires
Pan American Games medalists in fencing
Pan American Games silver medalists for Argentina
Fencers at the 1967 Pan American Games